Gwyneth Helen Lewis  is a British physician who is a professor at University College London. She previously served as National Clinical Director for Maternal Health and Maternity Services for the Department of Health. Lewis helped to write Maternity Matters, a strategy that outlined the future of maternity care in the United Kingdom.

Early life and education 
Lewis attended Oxford High School, England. She attended the UCL Medical School, where she earned her bachelor's degree in medicine and surgery and started her medical career as a surgical specialist. Lewis developed severe arthritis in her hands. She held positions in general practise and obstetrics. She believed that she would have a greater impact in the Department of Health and Social Care, working to support the National Health Service, and trained in public health. One of her first responsibilities was leading an HIV/AIDS clinic at the height of the first epidemic.

Research and career 
Lewis was recruited to the University College London Institute for Women's Health as Lead for International Women's Health Research. She studies national and international maternal health. Lewis was responsible for the UK Confidential Enquiries into Maternal Deaths. This research project, has helped reduce poor health and morbidity. In the 1999 report, Lewis identified that maternal mortality rates were higher for very young women, those from lower socioeconomic backgrounds and those from particular socioeconomic groups. She served as tsar for maternity services until 2011.

Lewis worked with the World Health Organization on Beyond the numbers, a study and guidebook that looks to improve the quality of maternal and newborn care. She received funding from the British Council to create My Sister, My Self, a short film that explored birth, motherhood and child loss amongst mothers around the world.

Awards and honours 
 2008 Bournemouth University Honorary Doctorate
 2009 Order of the British Empire for her work on Maternal Health
 2010 City, University of London Doctor of Science Honoris Causa

Selected publications

References 

Living people
Year of birth missing (living people)
Alumni of University College London
21st-century British educators
20th-century British medical doctors
21st-century British medical doctors
People educated at Oxford High School, England
Officers of the Order of the British Empire